Matthew Joseph Thaddeus Stepanek (July 17, 1990 – June 22, 2004), known as Mattie J.T. Stepanek, was an American poet (or, as he wanted to be remembered, "a poet, a peacemaker, and a philosopher who played") who published seven best-selling books of poetry and peace essays. Before his death at the age of 13, he had become known as a peace advocate and motivational speaker.

Life and career
Matthew Stepanek was born on July 17, 1990. Stepanek's parents divorced when he was a child. He was raised in Upper Marlboro, Maryland and later lived in Rockville, Maryland. His hero was former U.S. President Jimmy Carter, who described Stepanek as "the most extraordinary person whom I have ever known".

Stepanek suffered from a rare disorder, dysautonomic mitochondrial myopathy. His three older siblings died from the same illness. The condition was unknown until his mother was diagnosed with mitochondrial disease in 1992, after all four of the children had been born.

Stepanek was a poet and speaker, penning six volumes of bestselling Heartsongs poetry books, and a collection of peace essays that also became a bestseller.

He was the lyricist for Music Through Heartsongs. The album was produced by Sony, was released in 2003 and performed by Billy Gilman, and which debuted at number 109 on the Billboard 200 and at number 15 on Hot Country Songs.

Death
Stepanek died at age 13 at Children's National Medical Center in Washington, D.C., on June 22, 2004. He was interred at Gate of Heaven Cemetery in Silver Spring, Maryland.

Legacy
Shortly after Stepanek's death in 2004, the non-profit Mattie J.T. Stepanek Foundation was established by a group of citizens in Rockville, Maryland where he lived.

In 2008, the We Are Family Foundation hosted the first annual international Three Dot Dash 'Just Peace Summit' based on the message Stepanek offered in his book "Just Peace".

On October 21, 2008, the Mattie J.T. Stepanek Park was dedicated in Rockville, Maryland at an event attended by Oprah Winfrey, Nile Rodgers, Billy Gilman and others. Pepper Choplin set words from Stepanek's final peace speech to music, and a 100-voice choir performed the debut of "Look Up Way Down". Central to the park is the "Peace Garden", which was designed based on the peace imagery Stepanek used in his essay book, Just Peace: A Message of Hope. In the Peace Garden there is a life-size bronze statue of Stepanek and his service dog, Micah, surrounded by chess tables. Throughout the park are quotes and soundbites from Stepanek.

On June 6, 2010, a performance of "Heartsongs" took place at Carnegie Hall, featuring Stepanek's poetry set to music by composer Joseph Martin, and performed by a 200 voice combined Children's Choir and other members of the Distinguished Concerts Singers International under the direction of conductor Stephen Roddy.

In 2011, Oprah Winfrey named Stepanek as one of her all time most memorable guests in the 25-year history of her show. Mattie convinced Oprah not to retire from the show on its 20th anniversary through an email, saying that "it's good for the world and good for [Oprah]." During the final studio audience taping, Stepanek's mother and Oprah shared memories of Stepanek, discussed his life story in the "Messenger" book, and Oprah called him "a messenger for our times."

In 2013, the National Catholic Partnership on Disability posthumously honored Stepanek with the Youth/Young Adult Leadership Award.

At the behest of the Mattie J.T. Stepanek Foundation, in 2013, Barbara Mikulski, a United States senator from Maryland, sent a letter to US President Barack Obama, wanting to declare July 17 (Stepanek's birthday) a national peace day in Stepanek's honor. In July 2014, Ben Cardin, a junior United States senator from Maryland, joined Mikulski in introducing a House Resolution (#509), which was approved by the Senate and honors Stepanek's life and peace legacy. In 2017, the city of Rockville, Maryland voted to declare Mattie's July 17 birthday as "Peace Day" at a local level in perpetua, as a statement of support for the National Peace Day Campaign.

Cause for canonization 
On September 21, 2012, the feast of Matthew the Apostle, the Mattie J.T. Stepanek Guild was officially initiated. The purpose of the guild is to gather information and investigate Stepanek's life for the possible cause of canonization in the Catholic Church.

On June 22, 2014, a Memorial Mass at the Franciscan Monastery in Washington, D.C. commemorated the tenth anniversary of Stepanek's death. It was con-celebrated by several priests from the Archdiocese of Washington.

Awards
 1999 Melinda Lawrence International Book Award for inspirational written works from the Children's Hospice International, 1999
2004 Nu Skin Enterprises's Nu Skin Force for Good Foundation Lifetime Achievement Award
2007 Independent Publisher's 'Peacemaker of the Year' Award

References

External links
The Mattie J.T. Stepanek Foundation website
Jimmy Carter Eulogy for Mattie Stepanek
Interview on public radio show "Humankind" by David Freudberg

1990 births
2004 deaths
21st-century American poets
American child activists
American child writers
Deaths from muscular dystrophy
Poets from Maryland
People from Rockville, Maryland
People from Upper Marlboro, Maryland
Burials at Gate of Heaven Cemetery (Silver Spring, Maryland)
20th-century American poets